Robert Lee Johnson III (born November 29, 1958) is an American politician. He is a member of the Mississippi House of Representatives from the 94th District, being first elected in 2004. He is a member of the Democratic party. Johnson is also a former state senator (served 1993 to 2003).

References

1958 births
21st-century American politicians
Living people
Democratic Party members of the Mississippi House of Representatives